Md. Abdul Matin is an independent politician and the Former Member of Parliament from Moulvibazar-2.

Early life
Matin was born on 17 March 1945. In his political career he was an active member of Bangladesh Awami League though he left the party twice for political reasons once to be the upazila chairman where he joined Jatiya Party (Ershad) and later contested as an independent candidate in parliamentary election leaving the Awami League and became an MP. However, after becoming Member of Parliament, he somehow retained his identity as member of Awami League.

Career
Matin was elected to Parliament on 5 January 2014 from Moulvibazar-2 as an independent candidate. He was a member of Awami League and after becoming Member of parliament still managed to hold party position in Bangladesh Awami League.

References

Living people
1935 births
10th Jatiya Sangsad members
People from Kulaura Upazila
Independent politicians in Bangladesh